is a Japanese retired ice hockey player, currently serving as assistant coach to the Japanese women's national under-18 ice hockey team.

Playing career
Aoki represented Japan in the women's ice hockey tournament at the 2014 Winter Olympics, the women's ice hockey tournament at the 2003 Asian Winter Games, the 2012 IIHF Women's Challenge Cup of Asia (CCOA), and at four IIHF Women's World Championships, in the Top Division in 2004 and 2015, and in Division I in 2012 and 2013. 

Her club career was played with Mitsuboshi Daito Peregrine (now DK Peregrine) of the All-Japan Women's Ice Hockey Championship and Women's Japan Ice Hockey League (WJIHL) and with the Calgary Inferno of the Canadian Women's Hockey League (CWHL).

Aoki was drafted by the Calgary Inferno in the 6th round of the 2015 CWHL Draft. She scored her first goal for Calgary on 14 November 2015 against Les Canadiennes de Montréal. Appearing with the Calgary Inferno in the 2016 Clarkson Cup finals, she joined teammate Aina Takeuchi as the first women from Japan to win the Clarkson Cup, as the Inferno prevailed in an 8–3 final against Les Canadiennes.

References

External links 
 
 

1985 births
Living people
Asian Games medalists in ice hockey
Asian Games silver medalists for Japan
Calgary Inferno players
Clarkson Cup champions
Ice hockey players at the 2007 Asian Winter Games
Ice hockey players at the 2011 Asian Winter Games
Ice hockey players at the 2014 Winter Olympics
Japanese expatriate sportspeople in Canada
Japanese ice hockey coaches
Japanese women's ice hockey defencemen
Medalists at the 2007 Asian Winter Games
Medalists at the 2011 Asian Winter Games
Olympic ice hockey players of Japan
Expatriate ice hockey players in Canada
Japanese expatriate ice hockey people